In seven-dimensional geometry, a truncated 7-orthoplex is a convex uniform 7-polytope, being a truncation of the regular 7-orthoplex.

There are 6 truncations of the 7-orthoplex. Vertices of the truncation 7-orthoplex are located as pairs on the edge of the 7-orthoplex. Vertices of the bitruncated 7-orthoplex are located on the triangular faces of the 7-orthoplex. Vertices of the tritruncated 7-orthoplex are located inside the tetrahedral cells of the 7-orthoplex. The final three truncations are best expressed relative to the 7-cube.

Truncated 7-orthoplex

Alternate names
 Truncated heptacross
 Truncated hecatonicosoctaexon (Jonathan Bowers)

Coordinates 
Cartesian coordinates for the vertices of a truncated 7-orthoplex, centered at the origin, are all 168 vertices are sign (4) and coordinate (42) permutations of
 (±2,±1,0,0,0,0,0)

Images

Construction 
There are two Coxeter groups associated with the truncated 7-orthoplex, one with the C7 or [4,35] Coxeter group, and a lower symmetry with the D7 or [34,1,1] Coxeter group.

Bitruncated 7-orthoplex

Alternate names
 Bitruncated heptacross
 Bitruncated hecatonicosoctaexon (Jonathan Bowers)

Coordinates 
Cartesian coordinates for the vertices of a bitruncated 7-orthoplex, centered at the origin, are all sign and coordinate permutations of
 (±2,±2,±1,0,0,0,0)

Images

Tritruncated 7-orthoplex 
The tritruncated 7-orthoplex can tessellation space in the quadritruncated 7-cubic honeycomb.

Alternate names
 Tritruncated heptacross
 Tritruncated hecatonicosoctaexon (Jonathan Bowers)

Coordinates 
Cartesian coordinates for the vertices of a tritruncated 7-orthoplex, centered at the origin, are all sign and coordinate permutations of
 (±2,±2,±2,±1,0,0,0)

Images

Notes

References
 H.S.M. Coxeter: 
 H.S.M. Coxeter, Regular Polytopes, 3rd Edition, Dover New York, 1973 
 Kaleidoscopes: Selected Writings of H.S.M. Coxeter, edited by F. Arthur Sherk, Peter McMullen, Anthony C. Thompson, Asia Ivic Weiss, Wiley-Interscience Publication, 1995,  
 (Paper 22) H.S.M. Coxeter, Regular and Semi Regular Polytopes I, [Math. Zeit. 46 (1940) 380-407, MR 2,10]
 (Paper 23) H.S.M. Coxeter, Regular and Semi-Regular Polytopes II, [Math. Zeit. 188 (1985) 559-591]
 (Paper 24) H.S.M. Coxeter, Regular and Semi-Regular Polytopes III, [Math. Zeit. 200 (1988) 3-45]
 Norman Johnson Uniform Polytopes, Manuscript (1991)
 N.W. Johnson: The Theory of Uniform Polytopes and Honeycombs, Ph.D. 
  x3x3o3o3o3o4o - tez, o3x3x3o3o3o4o - botaz, o3o3x3x3o3o4o - totaz

External links 
 Polytopes of Various Dimensions
 Multi-dimensional Glossary

7-polytopes